Heinrich Hansen is the name of:
Heinrich Hansen (painter) (1821-1890), Danish architectural painter
Heinrich Hansen (theologian) (1861-1940), German theologian
 Adolf Heinrich-Hansen, painter